Elizabeth Mary Craik is a Scottish classical scholar, who is Honorary Professor of Classics at the University of St Andrews.

Education

Elizabeth Craik studied for an MA at the University of St Andrews (1960), an MLitt at Girton College, University of Cambridge (1963) and was awarded an honorary DLitt from the University of St Andrews in 2000.

Career

She began her career as a Research Fellow in Greek at the University of Birmingham (1963-1964). In 1964 she moved to the University of St Andrews as an Assistant Lecturer and stayed at St Andrews until 1997 by which time she was a Senior Lecturer in Greek. In 1993 she was awarded a Wellcome Trust research leave fellowship for one year to work on Hippocratic anatomical treatises. In the preface of her translation and commentary of the Hippocratic text Places in Man she describes this as an event which changed her life and lead to her seeking early retirement from the University of St Andrews.

Having completed this book in 1997 she took up a post as Professor of Classics at Kyoto University before retiring in 2002. From September 2003 to September 2005 she held an Emeritus Research Fellowship at the University of St Andrews, awarded by the Leverhulme Trust in order to complete her book Two Hippocratic Treatises On Sight and On Anatomy. As of 2015 she held honorary positions at the University of St Andrews and Newcastle University.

Selected works

Translations (with commentaries)

 The Hippocratic Treatise On Glands. Brill 2009
 Two Hippocratic Treatises On Sight and On Anatomy. Brill 2006 
 Hippocrates: Places in Man. Clarendon Press 1998 
 Euripides Phoenician Women. Aris & Phillips 1988

Books 
 The ‘Hippocratic’ Corpus Content and Context. Routledge 2015
 Marriage and property: women and marital customs in history. Macmillan 1991  
 The Dorian Aegean. Routledge 1980
 Marriage and Property. Aberdeen University Press 1984

References

Living people
1939 births
Classics educators
Academics of the University of St Andrews
Academics of the University of Birmingham
Academic staff of Kyoto University
Alumni of the University of St Andrews
Alumni of Girton College, Cambridge